The Golden Apricot Yerevan International Film Festival (GAIFF) is an annual film festival held in Yerevan, Armenia. The festival was founded in 2004 with the co-operation of the "Golden Apricot" Fund for Cinema Development, the Armenian Association of Film Critics and Cinema Journalists. The GAIFF is continually supported by the Ministry of Foreign Affairs of Armenia, the Ministry of Culture of Armenia and the Benevolent Fund for Cultural Development.The objectives of the festival are "to present new works by the film directors and producers in Armenia and foreign cinematographers of Armenian descent and to promote creativity and originality in the area of cinema and video art".

History

The "Golden Apricot" Annual Film Festival was established in 2004 in Yerevan, by the "Golden Apricot" Fund for Cinema Development, the Armenian Association of Film Critics and Cinema Journalists, supported by the Ministry of Foreign Affairs of Armenia, the Ministry of Culture of Armenia and Benevolent Fund for Cultural Development. Canadian-Armenian director Atom Egoyan was named president of the festival since 2005.

The Festival is dedicated to the theme of Crossroads of Cultures and Civilizations, and features a multitude of films representing various nations and religions, collectively depicting the richness of the human experience.

In 2005, the establishment of a network of filmmakers of the region entitled Directors Across Borders was initiated by the "Golden Apricot" Film Festival.

Since 2005 "Golden Apricot" has been functioning under the aegis of the European Cultural Parliament.

In 2010, the festival was awarded by the FICTS Plate D'honneur.

In 2017, festival organizers cancelled the screening of an off-competition program entitled, "Armenians: Internal And External Views", with no reasons given. LGBT activists took to social media to criticize the cancellation, with some claiming that two LGBTQ+-themed films — Apricot Groves and Listen to Me: Untold Stories Beyond Hatred — were the reason for the cancellation. Atom Egoyan and Arsinée Khanjian, prominent Armenian Canadian figures in cinema, denounced this cancellation. An open letter signed by filmmakers, activists, politicians, and others denouncing the cancellation was published, and LGBTQ+ rights organizations Pink Armenia and GALAS LGBTQ+ Armenian Society strongly criticized the censorship. The EU's Eastern Partnership Civil Society Forum called on Armenian authorities to fulfill their international commitments, stating that "The incident... runs contrary to the process of Armenia's joining the Creative Europe programme".

Awards and categories of competition
The major awards at the GAIFF are the Golden Apricot and Silver Apricot prizes for feature, documentary and Armenian panorama films. Lifetime achievement is recognized by the Parajonov's Thaler Award, named in honour of Sergei Parajanov.

The various categories and prize names are as follows:

International Feature Competition

1. "Golden Apricot" – Best Feature Film

2. "Silver Apricot" – Special Prize

International Documentary Competition

1. "Golden Apricot" – Best Documentary Film

2. "Silver Apricot" – Special Prize

"Apricot Stone" Short Film Competition

1. "Golden Stone" – Best Short Film

2. Special Prize

"Armenian Panorama" National Competition

1. "Golden Apricot" – Best Fiction Film

2. "Golden Apricot" – Best Documentary Film

3. "Silver Apricot" – Special Prize

Winners of the Grand Prix - Golden Apricot main prize for Best Feature Film

Awards GAIFF 2004

Awards GAIFF 2005

Awards GAIFF 2006

Awards GAIFF 2007

Awards GAIFF 2008

Awards GAIFF 2009

Awards GAIFF 2010

Awards GAIFF 2011

Awards GAIFF 2012

Awards GAIFF 2013

Awards GAIFF 2014

Awards GAIFF 2015

Awards GAIFF 2016

See also 
Media of Armenia

References

External links

GAIFF at IMDB
Golden Apricot Yerevan International Film Festival at Film Freeway
Golden Apricot Yerevan International Film Festival at FestAgent

 
Film festivals in Armenia
Annual events in Armenia
2004 establishments in Armenia
Recurring events established in 2004
Summer events in Armenia